Rolf Peter Wallin (born April 30, 1957) is a Swedish former professional ice hockey player and coach who played 52 games in the National Hockey League (NHL) with the New York Rangers during the 1980–81 and 1981–82 seasons. The rest of his career, which lasted from 1974 to 1991, was mainly spent in the Swedish Elitserien. As a coach, he was General Manager for Swedish national team during the 1998–99 and 1999–00 seasons.

Career statistics

Regular season and playoffs

International

References

External links
 

1957 births
Living people
Djurgårdens IF Hockey players
New York Rangers players
Ice hockey people from Stockholm
Södertälje SK players
Springfield Indians players
Swedish ice hockey right wingers
Tulsa Oilers (1964–1984) players
Undrafted National Hockey League players